The following lists events that happened during 2005 in the Republic of the Maldives.

Incumbents
President: Maumoon Abdul Gayoom

Events

May
 May 10 - The Maldives government releases dissident Fathimath Nisreen.

June
 June 2 - Parliament members support move to multi party democracy. Before the parliamentary debate, the Maldivian government arrested number of dissidents.

References

 
2000s in the Maldives
Years of the 21st century in the Maldives
Maldives
Maldives